T. M. "Tom" Graber (May 27, 1917 – June 26, 2007) was an American orthodontist known for his contributions to the field of orthodontics. Graber wrote 28 books on orthodontics and dental anatomy. He also wrote chapters in more than 20 books and over 175 published articles.

Life
Graber was born in 1917 in St. Louis and had five other siblings. He attended Soldan High School. He earned his dental degree from Washington University School of Dental Medicine in 1940. Before learning orthodontics, Graber served as a captain in the Dental Corps (United States Army) from 1941 to 1945 at Fort Bragg. He then earned his orthodontic degree from Northwestern University Dental School in 1946.  After that he pursued his PhD degree in anatomy from Northwestern University and completed it in 1950.

He was a faculty member at University of Michigan School of Dentistry, University of Gothenburg, Northwestern University (1946–58), University of Chicago (1969–82) where he was head of orthodontics, and University of Illinois at Chicago College of Dentistry from 1994 until his death.

He was married to Doris Graber, who was a professor of political science at University of Illinois at Chicago. They had five children: Lee Graber, Thomas Graber, Jack Graber, Jim Graber and Susan Graber.

Career
Graber founded the Kenilworth Research Foundation and was the director of the CE for the Greene Vardiman Black Institute since 1967. He was also the director of dental continuing education for University of Chicago from 1971 to 1981, founded the Northwestern University's Cleft Lip and Palate Institute along with the orthodontic program at University of Chicago Medical School, founded the Audiovisual Council of AAO in 1962, and was a founding member of Illinois Society of Orthodontists.

Graber's research in his early years focused on the treatment of birth defects. Later in this career, his research focused on growth and development issues related to jaws as well as treatment modalities for clicking in jaws. Graber did research on craniofacial anomalies, cleft palate, cleft lip, temporomandibular joint anatomy and disturbances, orthopedic growth guidance of the dentofacial complex, and the use of magnetic force in orthodontics and dentofacial orthopedics. He was a founding member of the Council on Orthodontic Education for the American Association of Orthodontists and also served as President of the Chicago Society of Orthodontists, the Edward H. Angle Society, and the Illinois Orthodontists Society. 

He received more awards than any orthodontist in history, including the Emperor of Japan's Order of the Sacred Treasure, the highest Japanese award ever bestowed upon a non-citizen of Japan. 

Graber founded the World Journal of Orthodontics in 2000. The Grabler Seminar Room in the University of Illinois at Chicago College of Dentistry's Department of Orthodontics is named for him. 

Over his lifetime, Graber served on editorial boards of 15 journals, and was an honorary member of more than 20 international orthodontic associations. He died at the age of 90 in Evanston, Illinois. At the time of his death, he remained editor-in-chief of the World Journal of Orthodontics.

Positions
 Chicago Society of Orthodontists, president
 Edward Angle Society, president
 Illinois Orthodontists Society, president
 Royal College of Surgeons of England, fellow, 1996
 American Journal of Orthodontics and Dentofacial Orthopedics, editor-in-chief, 1985–2000
 World Journal of Orthodontics, founder and editor-in-chief, 2000–07

Awards
 Emperor of Japan's Order of the Sacred Treasure, 2005 – Highest Japanese award ever bestowed upon a non-citizen of Japan
 Albert H. Ketcham Award, 1975
 AAO Distinguished Service Award, 1970
 Honorary Degrees from University of Michigan University, Washington University, Aristotle University, Kunming Medical University, University of Gothenburg

References

American orthodontists
People from St. Louis
1917 births
2007 deaths
University of Michigan faculty
Recipients of the Order of the Sacred Treasure
Washington University School of Dental Medicine alumni
20th-century dentists